Diavata is a town in Central Macedonia Greece. A community of the Delta municipality. Before the 2011 local government reform it was part of the municipality of Echedoros, of which it was a municipal district.

See also
 List of settlements in the Thessaloniki regional unit

References

Populated places in Thessaloniki (regional unit)